John Murison Duffus (10 May 1901 – 18 September 1975) was a Scottish footballer who played for Dumbarton, Millwall, Clapton Orient, Tottenham Hotspur, Norwich City and Stockport County.

References

1901 births
1975 deaths
Scottish footballers
Dumbarton F.C. players
Millwall F.C. players
Tottenham Hotspur F.C. players
Norwich City F.C. players
Stockport County F.C. players
Scottish Football League players
English Football League players
Leyton Orient F.C. players
Footballers from Aberdeen
Association football forwards